"Just Your Fool" (or "I'm Just Your Fool" as it was first titled) is a rhythm and blues-style song written and recorded by the American jazz and jump blues bandleader/pianist Buddy Johnson and His Orchestra in 1953. Called an "R&B anthem", the song has a big-band arrangement and his sister Ella Johnson on vocals—her "delicate and deceptively sweet phrasing was ideally suited to ballads such as this".  "I'm Just Your Fool" became a Billboard R&B chart record hit, reaching number six in 1954.

Little Walter version
Little Walter recorded a Chicago blues adaptation of the song using the title "Just Your Fool". It was recorded in December 1960 in Chicago, with Walter (vocal and blues harp) and backing by Otis Spann (piano), Fred Robinson and Luther Tucker (guitars), Willie Dixon and/or Jimmie Lee Robinson (bass), and Fred Below or George Hunter (drums).  "Just Your Fool" was not released until 1962 by Checker Records. He used lyrics and an eight-bar blues arrangement similar to Buddy Johnson. Checker credits the song to Little Walter, also known as Walter Jacobs.

Cyndi Lauper version
In 2010, the American singer Cyndi Lauper recorded "Just Your Fool" for her album Memphis Blues.  Charlie Musselwhite on blues harp accompanies Lauper on vocals. The song was released as a single and reached number two on Billboard magazine's US Digital Blues Songs chart. She performed it live with Musselwhite on the third-season finale of the Celebrity Apprentice reality game show.

The Rolling Stones version

The Rolling Stones recorded the song in 2016 for their album Blue & Lonesome. It is one of five Little Walter songs included on the album.  On October 6, 2016, it was released as the lead single.

Charts

References

1953 songs
Rhythm and blues songs
Blues songs
1962 singles
Little Walter songs
2010 singles
Cyndi Lauper songs
The Rolling Stones songs